Guindani is a surname. Notable people with the surname include:

Dante Guindani
Gaetano Guindani (1834–1904), Italian Roman Catholic bishop
Luciana Guindani (born 1937), Italian sprint canoer 
Manolo Guindani (born 1971), Italian manager and footballer

Italian-language surnames